Veene Sheshanna (1852—1926) was an exponent of the veena, an Indian string instrument, which he played in the classical Carnatic music style. He was a concert musician at the court of the princely state of Mysore in southern India, but his performances were admired throughout Eurasia, including by King George V, who held a portrait of him at the Buckingham Palace.

Family
Veene Sheshanna was born in Mysore in 1852 into a Madhwa Brahmin family of celebrated classical musicians. His father, Chikkaramappa, was a Vainika (player of the veena) in the court of the Maharaja of Mysore. The musical history of the family goes far back and Sheshanna was the descendant of Pachchimeeriyam Aadi Appayya, a noted composer of Carnatic music. According to contemporary practise in Mysore, Sheshanna was married at the age of twelve. His father died soon afterwards.

Training and career

Sheshanna displayed precocious musical talent as a young boy of five. At an early age, he caught the eye of the Maharaja and received expensive gifts from him. He learnt music from Mysore Sadashiva Rao and Veene Venkatasubbayya. He was a diligent student and practised music for several hours each day. The story goes that he would have a heap of a hundred tamarind seeds and each time he played a composition, he transferred a seed to another heap. He did this under the watchful eyes of his elder sister who herself had an excellent knowledge of music and was a demanding tutor. He initially learnt vocal music but then switched to playing the saraswati veena, in which he soon gained proficiency.

He toured South India and gave performances at various places. These performances were at the homes of rich patrons of the arts and in the courts of the Rajas as public performances as we know today were practically non-existent in those days. On his return from his tour, he was appointed as the court musician in the court of the Maharaja of Mysore.

His musical talent was prodigious and is reputed to have a mastered many instruments other than the veena, like the violin, piano and swarabat (a lute like instrument also known as swaragat). Once, a musician from North India played the jal tarang (a tuned percussion instrument made of porcelain cups tuned with varying amounts of water) in the court and the Maharaja was very much impressed by it. Sheshanna requested the artist to leave the instrument with him overnight and the next evening gave a concert of Carnatic music on that instrument in the Maharaja’s presence.

Musical style
Until the late 19th century, the veena would be held vertically as while being played. Not unlike the sitar, the gourd would rest in the lap of the player, who would sit cross-legged while performing. Sheshanna established a new convention by keeping the veena in a horizontal position while playing it. That is the way it is now played. 

Sheshanna seems to be the originator of what is now the known as the Mysore style of playing the veena. This style is characterised by the two fingers being used alternately to press the string to the frets. They are kept separated from each other most of the time.

Contributions
Sheshanna composed 53 pieces of music, including Swarajatis, Padas, Javalis and many Tillanas. He had a deep understanding of Hindustani music as well. His thillanas in the ragas Behag and Darbari Kannada are proof of this.

The composers Mysore Vasudevacharya and Rallapalli Anantha Krishna Sharma, among others, have showered liberal praise on Sheshanna's technical virtuosity. His fame spread far and wide, yet he always retained his humility. He is reputed to have often exclaimed, "One can play the Veena according to one's own abilities. Where can you find the musician who can play it to its full potential?"

Sheshanna used to give public music concerts during the annual Ramanavami and Krishnashthami festivals. These concerts were organised on the roof of his own house and all were welcome to attend them. They were held for ten days each at the time of these two festivals. This brought music from the king’s court and the rich man’s mansion to the doorstep of the common man. 

One of the Sheshanna's most beloved concert veenas as well as Raja Ravi Varma's famous portrait of him can be viewed at the Manjusha Museum, a conservatory of historical artefacts in Dharmasthala, Karnataka.

References

External links
Veene Sheshanna (1852-1926) at musicalnirvana.com

1852 births
1926 deaths
Saraswati veena players
Musicians from Mysore
20th-century Indian musicians
19th-century Indian musicians
Madhva Brahmins